Hidden Stash 420 is a 2009 compilation album from American hip hop group Kottonmouth Kings. It is their fourth compilation album and includes b-sides, remixes, demos, solo tracks by Kottonmouth Kings members D-Loc and Johnny Richter, and collaborations with other artists.  The album comprises 40 tracks on two discs.

The Best Buy edition of the album includes a bonus DVD titled Lost Adventures which consists of two hours of behind the scenes footage and videos.

Track listing

Disc one

Disc two

References

Kottonmouth Kings albums
B-side compilation albums
2009 remix albums
2009 compilation albums
Suburban Noize Records compilation albums
Suburban Noize Records remix albums
Sequel albums